The Social Democratic Party (Partido Social Demócrata, PSD) was created following a split in the Social democratic union party on April 9, 2007 in Spain, in the Valencian Community, its ideology is social democratic.

The aims of the PSD are to obtain votes in all of Spain and to stimulate direct participation in politics. It gained relevancy in the local and regional elections of May 27, 2007 in the Valencian Community, in the Community of Madrid, in Murcia, Extremadura, Cantabria, Aragón, Andalucía and Castilla La Mancha.

In the 2007 elections it gained councillors in some cities:

 Valencian Community: 11,062 votes - 13 councillors and 1 mayor
 Extremadura: 939 votes - 7 councillors

In the 2008 Spanish general election it failed to win a seat in either the senate or congress. It received 19,042 votes for the Congress of Deputies, which represented 0.08% of the total. Of those votes, 4,047 came from Andalucía (although the party didn't stand there in the autonomous elections) and 3,309 in the Valencian Community. The party failed to stand in the Basque Country, and in Melilla.

External links 
 Partido Social Demócrata

References

Libertas.eu
Political parties in the Valencian Community
Defunct social democratic parties in Spain